The illegal drug trade in Latin America concerns primarily the production and sale of cocaine and cannabis, including the export of these banned substances to the United States and Europe. The coca cultivation is concentrated in the Andes of South America, particularly in Colombia, Peru and Bolivia; this is the world's only source region for coca.

Drug consumption in Latin America remains relatively low, but cocaine in particular has increased in recent years in countries along the major smuggling routes. As of 2008, the primary pathway for drugs into the United States is through Mexico and Central America, though crackdowns on drug trafficking by the Mexican government has forced many cartels to operate routes through Guatemala and Honduras instead. This is a shift from the 1980s and early 90s, when the main smuggling route was via the Caribbean into Florida. The United States is the primary destination, but around 25 to 30% of global cocaine production travels from Latin America to Europe, typically via West Africa.

The major drug trafficking organizations (drug cartels) are Mexican and Colombian, and said to generate a total of $18 to $39bn in wholesale drug proceeds per year. Mexican cartels are currently considered the "greatest organized crime threat" to the United States. Since February 2010, the major Mexican cartels have again aligned in two factions, one integrated by the Juárez Cartel, Tijuana Cartel, Los Zetas and the Beltrán-Leyva Cartel;  the other faction integrated by the Gulf Cartel, Sinaloa Cartel and La Familia Cartel.

Prior to the Mexican cartels' rise, the Colombian Cali cartel and Medellín cartel dominated in the late 1980s and early 90s. Following their demise, the Norte del Valle cartel has filled the Colombian vacuum, along with rightwing paramilitaries (e.g. United Self-Defense Forces of Colombia, AUC) and leftwing insurgent groups (FARC, ELN).

As a result of the concentration of drug trafficking, Latin America and the Caribbean has the world's highest crime rates, with murder reaching 32.6 per 100,000 of population in 2008. Violence has surged in Mexico since 2006 when Mexican President Felipe Calderón intensified the Mexican Drug War.

United States and Latin American drug control
Since 2008, the U.S. Congress has supported the Central American Regional Security Initiative (CARSI) with approximately $800 million to "fund programs for narcotics interdiction, strengthening law enforcement and justice institutions and violence prevention through work with at-risk youth". The CARSI offers equipment (vehicles and communication equipment), technical support and guidance to counter drug trade. The program also supports special units that cooperate with the U.S. Drug Enforcement Administration in Guatemala and Honduras to investigate drug cartels, share intelligence, and promote regional collaboration.

Colombia

For more than ten years, the U.S. has been funding Plan Colombia, which aims to combat illegal drugs production in the country, especially the growing of coca, the plant from which cocaine is produced. Former President Obama's top drug policy adviser, R. Gil Kerlikowske, announced a drug plan in May 2010 emphasizing prevention and treatment in the United States.

Peru

The administration has left financing for eradication projects in the Andes largely unchanged, despite debate over whether such efforts can sharply restrict the supply of cocaine or significantly increase the price in the United States in the long run. American anti-narcotics aid for Peru stands at $71.7 million this year, slightly higher than last year's $70.7 million. American anti-narcotics officials operate from a newly expanded Peruvian police base in Tingo María, overseeing Peruvian teams that fan out to nearby valleys to cut down coca bushes by hand.

Guatemala

The U.S. has worked with Guatemalan authorities to clamp down on South American cocaine routes, many of which use Guatemala as a landing zone. In October 2013, the US supplied six twin-engine "Super Huey" helicopters to Guatemala in an effort to halt illegal air traffic.

Mexico 
Mexico is estimated to be the world's third largest producer of opium with poppy cultivation. It also is a major supplier of heroin and the largest foreign supplier of marijuana, cocaine and methamphetamine to the U.S. market. These drugs are supplied by Drug Trafficking Organizations (DTOs). The U.S. government estimates that Mexican DTOs gain tens of billions of dollars each year from drug sales in the U.S. alone.

DTOs are continually battling for control of territory in Mexico used for the cultivation, importation and transportation of illicit drugs. The U.S. government considers groups affiliated with DTOs a significant threat to the safety within the U.S. The Drug Enforcement Administration (DEA) enforces 'the controlled substances laws and regulations of the US and pursues organizations and members involved in the growing, manufacture, or distribution of controlled substances appearing in or destined for illicit traffic in the U.S.'. The Mexican DTOs that pose the biggest threat to the US, according to the DEA, are the Sinaloa Cartel, Jalisco New Generation Cartel, Juarez Cartel, Gulf Cartel, Los Zetas Cartel and the Beltran-Leyva Organization.

In 2007, the U.S. launched the Merida initiative, a bilateral partnership that supports Mexico's law enforcement, helps to counteract the illegal trade in narcotics and strengthens border security. The four main focuses of this initiative are 'disrupting organized criminal groups; institutionalizing the rule of law; creating a 21st-century border, and building strong and resilient communities'. More recently, the initiative focused on improving security around Mexico's southern border and countering the production and trafficking of heroin and fentanyl. Until March 2017, more than $1.6bn has been invested in the Merida initiative, of which almost $900,000 was spent on protective equipment necessary for the secured demolishing of narcotic labs.

In Mexico, the DEA combats operations of DTOs by conducting bilateral investigations with foreign counterparts, providing investigative assistance and leads to DEA domestic offices and other agencies, providing training and technical equipment to 'host nation participants to initiate and carry out complex criminal investigations, providing assistance in developing drug control laws and regulations, and providing training and material support to foreign law enforcement counterparts'.

Puerto Rico 
See: Illegal drugs in Puerto Rico

Legalization debate 

Latin American leaders, including the presidents of Colombia, Guatemala and Mexico, have called for debate about legalizing and regulating aspects of drug production, trade or use. Some Latin leaders are discussing the need to experiment further with decriminalizing possession of drugs. Lawmakers are also proposing to scrap jail terms for growing coca and cannabis. As some Latin American leaders call for legalization of narcotics, Peru, a leading coca grower, remains opposed.

Drugs and government corruption

Several Latin American and Caribbean countries have at times seen governments actively involved in the illegal drug trade in the 1970s and 1980s. 1978 and 1980 saw "cocaine coups" in Honduras and Bolivia which brought such governments to power (see illegal drug trade in Honduras and illegal drug trade in Bolivia). In Panama, Manuel Noriega, a long-term drug trafficker, was head of the military from 1983 to 1989, with CIA support.

The Colombian parapolitics scandal revealed links between parts of the Colombian establishment and the United Self-Defense Forces of Colombia (AUC), a paramilitary group responsible for killing tens of thousands of Colombian civilians, which controls over 75% of the Colombian cocaine trade. The illegal drug trade in Peru was until 2000 shaped by Vladimiro Montesinos's involvement; he had been head of the country's intelligence service since 1990.

In 2010 it was alleged that the Mexican Sinaloa cartel had used bribery to co-opt the federal government and focus the government's anti-drug efforts on its competitors. According to Peter Dale Scott, "The Guadalajara Cartel, Mexico's most powerful drug-trafficking network in the early 1980s, prospered largely because it enjoyed the protection of the DFS, under its chief Miguel Nazar Haro, a CIA asset."

See also 
 Cannabis in Spain
 Crime and violence in Latin America
 Illegal drug trade in the Philippines
 Illegal drug trade in Bolivia
 Maritime drug trafficking in Latin America

References

External links
Latin American Crime and US Relations from the Dean Peter Krogh Foreign Affairs Digital Archives
 Latin America's Drug War Evolution
 Farmers Losing Columbia's Drug War
 The Cocaine Industry in Bolivia-Its Impact on the Peasantry
 Coca Production Makes a Comeback in Peru